Dagon Seikkan Township is an urban township of Yangon, Myanmar.

Geography
Dagon Seikkan Township is located in the east-central part of the city of Yangon. Dagon Seikkan Township shares borders with Hlegu Township to the north, South Dagon Township to the northwest, Thaketa Township to the southwest, and Thanlyin Township across the Bago River to the east and southeast.

Since 2007, Dagon Seikkan has been linked to Thanlyin Township by the Dagon Bridge, the second bridge to be built across the Bago River in Yangon.

Administration
, Dagon Seikkan consisted of 39 wards and five village tracts.

Demographics
Satellite communities and industry moved into the township in the 1990s, growing from a rural population of under 10,000 to almost 100,000 by 2010.

Education
, the township had 10 primary schools, two middle schools and a high school. The township is in an industrial area of the city. Nationalities Youth Resource Development Degree College, Yangon is located in the township.

Economy
The Samanea Yangon Market, a wholesale and retail market in Dagon Seikkan Township, was built in 2020.

Notes

Townships of Yangon